Deliverance is an album by the Australian rock band You Am I, released in 2002.

Tim Rogers later said of the album, "We just wanted 3-minute songs about being in love and rooting and loving being in a rock 'n' roll band and I think everyone associated with us absolutely hates it."

Track listing
All songs written by Tim Rogers.
 "Words For Sadness"
 "Who Put the Devil in You"
 "'Til The Clouds Roll Away"
 "Ribbons and Bows"
 "Deliverance"
 "One Trick Tony"
 "The Wrong Side Now"
 "Nifty Lil' Number Like You"
 "City Lights"
 "Crash"
 "Nuthin's Ever Gonna Be the Same Again"
 "When You Know What You Want"

Charts

References

2002 albums
You Am I albums